The 2,520 railway stations on the National Rail network in Great Britain are classified into six categories (two of which are each divided into two subcategories) by the Department for Transport. The scheme was devised in 1996 and there was a review in 2009 when 106 stations changed categories. The categorisation scheme is owned by Network Rail, the site landlord of most of the stations.

Some stations are in more than one category: for instance, at London St Pancras International, the surface platforms are in category A and the Thameslink platforms are in category C1.

Categorisation scheme

Category C stations are sub-divided into C1 (city or busy junction) and C2 (other busy railheads).

Category F stations are sub-divided into F1 (over 100,000 journeys per annum) and F2 (others).

See also
German railway station categories
Netherlands railway station categories

References